Al Ittihad Al Riyadi Al Asskary more commonly known as Ittihad Al Asskary or simply Al Ittihad is a Libyan football club based in Tripoli, Libya.

In 1996 the team reached the Libyan Cup final for the first time in the club's history where they were beaten 2–0 by Al-Ahly SC (Benghazi).

Honours
Libyan Cup
Runners-up: 1996

References

External links

Football clubs in Libya
Sport in Tripoli, Libya